Men of the Navy (Swedish: Örlogsmän) is a 1943 Swedish drama film directed by Börje Larsson and starring Nils Kihlberg, Karl-Arne Holmsten and Anne-Margrethe Björlin. The film's sets were designed by the art director Bibi Lindström.

Cast 
Karl-Arne Holmsten as Arne Ramberg
Nils Kihlberg as Erik Svensson
Anne-Margrethe Björlin as Ingrid Peijer
Emil Fjellström as August Sjöberg
Fritiof Billquist as Captain Wall
Gunnar Sjöberg as Engineer Kärre
Hugo Björne as Commander Peijer
Gustaf Torrestad as Second lieutenant Bernt
Åke Uppström as Engine attendant Karlsson
Artur Rolén as Skipper Hake
Wiktor Kulörten Andersson as Boman
Astrid Bodin as Selma Boman
Åke Engfeldt as Flag cadet Klas Löfgren

References

Bibliography
 Gustafsson, Fredrik. The Man from the Third Row: Hasse Ekman, Swedish Cinema and the Long Shadow of Ingmar Bergman. Berghahn Books, 2016.

External links 
 

1943 films
1940s Swedish-language films
Swedish black-and-white films
Swedish romantic drama films
1943 romantic drama films
Films directed by Börje Larsson
1940s Swedish films